The 1944 United States Senate election in Louisiana was held on November 7, 1944.  Incumbent Democratic Senator John H. Overton was elected to a third term in office.

On September 12, Overton won the Democratic primary with 61.64% of the vote. 

At this time, Louisiana was a one-party state (no other party had run a candidate for Senate since the passage of the Seventeenth Amendment), and the Democratic nomination was tantamount to victory. Overton won the November general election without an opponent.

Democratic primary

Candidates
Charles S. Gerth, New Orleans businessman
Griffin T. Hawkins, Lake Charles district attorney
John H. Overton, incumbent Senator since 1933
E. A. Stephens, candidate for Senate in 1942

Campaign
E. A. Stephens criticized Overton for having been "an isolationist before Pearl Harbor."

Griffin Hawkins campaigned for the preservation of white supremacy, using the slogans "Insure White Supremacy" and "Protect Our Future."

On the night before the primary, Senator Overton held a radio address to rebut attacks on his record. Both Hawkins and Gerth predicted that no candidate would receive a majority and the primary would require a runoff; Hawkins thought he would lead the field and Gerth, more humbly, said he would finish second to Overton. Stephens expressed confidence that he would win the nomination outright, and Overton confidently projected that he would win a majority of two to one against the field.

Results

General election

References

1944
Louisiana
United States Senate
Single-candidate elections